Dr. Rita Dev is a Hindustani classical singer.  She is a disciple of the Thumri vocalist Padma Vibhushan Vidhushi, Dr. Girija Devi.

Dev was born in Assam.

Early life and education 

Dev completed her primary education in classical music at an early age under the guidance of Guru Nirmal Acharya. After pursuing M.A. from Banaras Hindu University, she did her Doctorate in classical music under the guidance of Prof. Chittaranjan Jyotishi of Gwalior Gharana. She also got a golden opportunity of learning light classical music under the Legendary Vocalist of Banaras Gharana, Late. Pt. Mahadev Prasad Mishra.

Career 
Dev is Professor (vocal) and head of the department of music, associated with Agra College, Agra.

Awards 

Dev received several prestigious awards and honors including the Pt. Omkarnath Thakur Award, Swara Ratna, Sangeet Ratna and many more.

References 

Hindustani singers
Thumri
Musicians from Varanasi
Indian women classical singers
Women Hindustani musicians
Women musicians from Uttar Pradesh
21st-century Indian women singers
21st-century Indian singers
Year of birth missing (living people)
Living people